The Cottbus tramway is a network of tramways forming the backbone of the public transport system in Cottbus, a city in the federal state of Brandenburg, Germany.

Rolling stock
A fleet of 21 KTNF6 trams, built from 1981 until 1988, is operated in Cottbus, which are due to be replaced in the future.

See also
List of town tramway systems in Germany
Trams in Germany

References

Notes

Bibliography

External links

 

Cottbus
Cottbus
Transport in Brandenburg
Metre gauge railways in Germany
600 V DC railway electrification
Cottbus